EUK may refer to:
 Air Atlanta Europe, a defunct British airline
 Edinburgh UK Tracker Trust, a British investment trust
 Entertainment UK, a defunct British retailer